The Zimbabwe National Baseball Team is the national baseball team of Zimbabwe. The team represents Zimbabwe in international competitions.

History

Rhodesia Baseball(1952-1979)

Zimbabwean Baseball(1980-Present)

In 1992, the 1st African Baseball and Softball Association(ABSA) Congress and Africa Cup Baseball Championship was organised in Harare, Zimbabwe, with only four countries competing. In 1995, the 3rd Africa Cup Baseball Championship and ABSA Congress was also held in Harare, Zimbabwe.

Tournament record

Africa Cup Baseball Championship

All-Africa Games
The first time Baseball featured in the All-Africa Games was in 1999 in the 7th All-Africa Games in South Africa and for the second and last time, in 2003, in the 8th All-Africa Games in Nigeria.

References

National baseball teams in Africa
baseball